Craig Emmerson (born 14 September 1971) is an English-born rugby union player. He was the first player to ever have a transfer fee paid for them when he moved from Morley to Gloucester in 1995 just as professionalism had been passed by the International Board.

Biography 

Emmerson was born in Halifax, West Yorkshire, England on 14 September 1971. He began his rugby union career at the age of 16 for Halifax RUFC. He also has played for West Hartlepool, Harlequins, Morley, Gloucester, Leeds Tykes and Wakefield.

He is an electrician by trade.

Honours 

England Colts
North of England U21
North of England

References

 Playfair Rugby Union Annual 1998/99

1971 births
Living people
English rugby union players
Gloucester Rugby players
Halifax RUFC coaches
Harlequin F.C. players
Leeds Tykes players
Morley R.F.C. players
Rugby union players from Halifax, West Yorkshire
Wakefield RFC players